The 1926 Preakness Stakes was the 51st running of the $63,625 Preakness Stakes Thoroughbred horse race. The race took place on May 10, 1926 and was run before the Kentucky Derby. Ridden by John Maiben, in a major upset Display won the race by a head over runner-up Blondin. The race was run on a track rated fast in a final time of 1:59 4/5

Payout 
The 51st Preakness Stakes Payout Schedule

The full chart 
Daily Racing Form Chart

 Winning Breeder: Walter J. Salmon, Sr.; (KY)
 Times: 1/4 mile – 0:23 2/5; 1/2 mile – 47 3/5; 3/4 mile – 1:13 flat; mile – 1:38 4/5; 1 3/16 (final) – 1:59 4/5
 Track Condition: Fast

References

External links 
 

1926
Pimlico Race Course
1926 in horse racing
1926 in American sports
1926 in sports in Maryland
Horse races in Maryland